Andrzej Czok (11 November 1948 – 11 January 1986) was a Polish mountaineer best known for making the first winter ascent of Dhaulagiri on 21 January 1985 with Jerzy Kukuczka, and for the first ascent of the South Pillar route on Mount Everest in 1980 (also with Kukuczka). He suffered a pulmonary oedema while making a winter attempt on Kangchenjunga in 1985–86 and died at Camp III. He was buried nearby in a crevasse.

See also
List of 20th-century summiters of Mount Everest

References

MountEverest.net Polish mountaineering timeline

1948 births
1986 deaths
Mountaineering deaths
Polish mountain climbers
Polish summiters of Mount Everest
Sportspeople from Zabrze